is a correctional facility in Higashi-ku, Nagoya. A part of the penal system of Japan, it is operated by the Ministry of Justice.

One of Japan's seven execution chambers is in this facility.

Notable prisoners
Kiyotaka Katsuta – Serial killer, executed in 2000.
Tsukasa Kanda – Executed in 2015.

References

Buildings and structures in Nagoya
Prisons in Japan
Execution sites in Japan